Fuad Bicaku was an Albanian politician and mayor of Elbasan between 1913 and 1915.

References

Year of birth missing
Year of death missing
Mayors of Elbasan